The Carboneras Fault or Carboneras Fault Zone is major sinistral (left-lateral) strike-slip fault in the Province of Almería, southern Spain. It has a NE–SW trend and forms part of the Eastern Betic Shear Zone. It extends for about 50 km onshore, but is interpreted to continue offshore into the Alboran Sea for at least a further 90 km. It is thought to be seismically active and movement on the offshore part of this fault may have been responsible for the 1522 Almería earthquake.

References

Seismic faults of Europe
Geology of Spain